Alejo García Pintos  (born February 4, 1967) is an Argentine actor.

Filmography

Movies

Theater

Television

Footnotes

External links
 
 
 Alejo Garcia Pintos Before and After

1967 births
Argentine male film actors
Argentine male television actors
Living people